Taius (Taio, Tago, Tajo, Tajón, Tayon) (c. 600—c. 683) was a bishop of Zaragoza during the Visigothic period, from 651-664, succeeding his teacher Saint Braulius.  His surname was Samuel (Samuhel). Taius, like Braulius and Bishop Ildefonsus, was also a pupil of Saint Isidore of Seville.

Career 
Taius was ordained as a priest in 632, and later served as an abbot in an unknown monastery.

At the request of Quiricus of Barcelona, Taius compiled a collection of extracts from the work of Gregory the Great in 653–654. In 654 progress on the compilation was slowed by the revolt of Froia and the invasion of the Basques.  He later traveled to Rome, where he was sent to procure the third part of Gregory's Moralia, then missing in Spain. He received this work from Pope Martin I. His main work involved compiling others' works. In a letter to Eugene II of Toledo, he explained the plan of his writing and its relationship to Gregory’s model.

During Froia's siege, Taius had been working on a revision of the Lex Visigothorum and was unable to leave the city.

The result was what has been regarded as a “poorly organized” book called Sententiarum libri V, which drew heavily upon the writings of Gregory and Saint Augustine, his only known work.

He participated in the Eighth Council of Toledo, the Ninth Council of Toledo and the Tenth Council of Toledo.

Notes

Sources
Collins, Roger. Visigothic Spain, 409–711. Oxford: Blackwell Publishing, 2004. .
García Villada, Z. “Fragmentos inéditos de Tajón.”  RABM 30 (1914), 23–31.
Madoz, J. “Tajón de Zaragoza y su viaje a Roma.”  Mélanges Joseph de Ghellink 1:345–60.
Palacios Martín, A. “Tajón de Zaragoza y la ‘Explicatio in Cantica Canticorum.’”  AEF 3 (1980) 115–27.
Robles, L. “Tajón de Zaragoza, continuador de Isidoro.”  Saitabi 21 (1971), 19–25.
Serratosa, R. “Osio de Córdoba.  Tajón de Zaragoza.”  Estudios 19 (1951), 85–95.
Vega, A. C. “Tajón de Zaragoza.  Una obra inédita.”  CD 155 (1943) 145–77.

External links
 
  España sagrada: Vol. 31 Ed. Enrique Florez. Madrid: 1770. Includes a reprint of the Sententiarum Libri V and associated material (pp 152–544).

7th-century bishops in the Visigothic Kingdom
People from Zaragoza
7th-century Latin writers